Saint-Elzéar-de-Témiscouata is a municipality in the Témiscouata Regional County Municipality in the Bas-Saint-Laurent region of Quebec, Canada.

Prior to January 19, 2002, it was known simply as Saint-Elzéar.

See also
 List of municipalities in Quebec

References

Municipalities in Quebec
Incorporated places in Bas-Saint-Laurent